Vembadi Girls’ High School ( Vēmpaṭi Mahaḷir Uyartarap Pāṭacālai) is a national school in Jaffna, Sri Lanka. Founded in 1834 by British Methodist missionaries, it is one of Sri Lanka's oldest schools.

History
Methodist missionaries from Britain arrived in Ceylon on 29 June 1814. Two of the missionaries, Rev. James Lynch and Rev. Thomas Squance, traveled to Jaffna leaving Galle on 14 July 1814 and arriving in Jaffna on 11 August 1814, to establish a mission. In 1817, the Jaffna Wesleyan English School was founded with Rev. Lynch as principal. Despite it being a boys school, there were a few girls enrolled as well. The school was renamed Jaffna Central School in 1834 by the then principal Rev. Dr. Peter Percival. In the same year a separate girls school was established. The girls school was renamed Vembadi Girls' High School in 1897.

In 1944, Vembadi started providing free education. Most private schools in Ceylon, including Vembadi, were taken over by the government in 1960. In 1984 Vembadi became a national school.

See also
 :Category:Alumni of Vembadi Girls' High School
 List of schools in Northern Province, Sri Lanka

References

External links

 Vembadi Girls’ High School
 Vembadi Old Girls' Association (UK)
 Vembadi Old Girls' Association (Sydney Branch, Australia)
 Vembadi Old Girls' Association (Canada)

1834 establishments in Ceylon
Boarding schools in Sri Lanka
Educational institutions established in 1834
Former Methodist schools in Sri Lanka
Girls' schools in Sri Lanka
National schools in Sri Lanka
Schools in Jaffna
Wesleyan Methodist Mission of Ceylon (North) schools
Schools in Sri Lanka founded by missionaries